Davide Marcandella (born 21 March 1997) is an Italian footballer who plays as a midfielder for  club Vis Pesaro.

Career
He was raised in the Padova junior teams. He made his senior football debut in the 2015–16 season in Serie D on loan to Este. Upon returning from loan, he didn't make any appearances in the first half of the 2016–17 season, and on 4 January 2017 he was loaned to another Serie D club, Adriese.

He made his Serie C debut for Padova on 14 October 2017 in a game against Teramo, as an 80th-minute substitute for Giampiero Pinzi. On 1 March 2018, he extended his Padova contract until June 2020. For the 2018–19 season, Padova advanced to Serie B, with Marcandella making his debut on that level.

On 2 September 2019, he extended his Padova contract until 2022 and was loaned to Virtus Verona for the 2019–20 season. On 29 August 2020, the loan was extended for the 2020–21 season.

On 7 July 2021, he joined Vis Pesaro on a two-year contract with an additional one-year extension option.

References

External links
 

1997 births
Living people
Sportspeople from Padua
Footballers from Veneto
Italian footballers
Association football midfielders
Serie B players
Serie C players
Serie D players
Calcio Padova players
Virtus Verona players
Vis Pesaro dal 1898 players